Frederick Reginald Reynolds (7 August 1833 – 18 April 1915) was an English first-class cricketer who played for Cambridge Town Club  and other Cambridge-based sides from 1854 to 1867, and for Lancashire County Cricket Club from 1865 to 1874.

Reynolds was born at Bottisham, Cambridgeshire. He became a professional cricketer and was employed at Charterhouse School in 1853 and 1854. He played intermittently for Cambridge Town Club from 1854 to 1867. During this period, he was a professional groundstaff bowler with Marylebone Cricket Club (MCC) in 1855. From 1856 to 1857 he was at Botesdale, Suffolk. In 1858 he played for the United All-England Eleven (UEE) on tour; in 1859 and 1860 he made similar tours with the All-England Eleven (AEE). In 1861, he joined Manchester Cricket Club as a ground bowler and then became ground manager. In 1865 he made his debut for Lancashire, playing for them until 1874. He achieved two five-wicket innings in 1865 and one in 1866. The match against Surrey at Old Trafford on 26 May 1870 was played as his benefit match. During the 1870 season he achieved two five-wicket innings. In November 1870, he was promoted to the offices of Acting Assistant Secretary, Collector and General Manager of the Manchester Cricket Club. In the 1871 season he achieved two more five-wicket innings.

Reynolds was initially a right-hand fast roundarm bowler with a break-back from the off and an easy action. He was later a slow underarm bowler. He took 208 first-class wickets at an average of 17.58 and with a best performance of six for 58. He was a hard-hitting tail-end right-handed batsman and played 106 innings in 65 first-class matches with an average of 5.55 and a top score of 34 not out.

References

1833 births
1915 deaths
English cricketers
Lancashire cricketers
Cambridge Town Club cricketers
North v South cricketers
All-England Eleven cricketers
United All-England Eleven cricketers
People from Bottisham
Cambridgeshire and Yorkshire cricketers